Dolphin Browser is a web browser for the Android and iOS operating systems developed by MoboTap Inc. It was one of the first alternative browsers for the Android platform that introduced support for multi-touch gestures. Dolphin Browser uses its native platform's default browser engine.

Features
 Tabbed browsing – users can open and switch between web pages with multiple tabs either at the top of the screen or as thumbnail buttons at the bottom.
 Dolphin Sonar – users can use voice to search, share and navigate.
 Gesture browsing – users can draw characters to navigate to websites. Users can use preloaded gestures for popular websites or create custom gestures as needed.
 Sync – across devices and desktop browsers using a Firefox or Chrome extension.
 Webzine – displays web content in a magazine-style format, serving content from over 300 sources, and caching content to be available offline.

Versions
Both iOS and Android versions are proprietary software and are distributed for free.  There is an advanced version called Dolphin Browser for Android 2.0 or later. Dolphin Browser Beta was released in May 2012 with the in-house HTML5 engine Jetpack. In December 2013, Dolphin Zero, a privacy-focused version, was released.

Privacy concerns
In October 2011, privacy concerns were raised about Dolphin browser after it was discovered that all URLs loaded in Dolphin HD were being relayed as plain text to a remote server, a process described by Ars Technica as "an unambiguous breach of privacy". This breach was patched in the next update.

Reception
Since its initial release for Android, Dolphin has received generally positive reviews. The Android and iOS versions have been lauded for their gesture-based functionality, speed and ease-of-use. Business Insider claims "Dolphin Browser blows Safari out of the water." As of December 2021, the browser holds an approval rate of 78% on rating aggregator site Rouvou.

The app was named one of PC Magazines Best Free iPhone and iPad Apps of 2011, was a PC Magazine Editors Choice in 2012, and was included in the CNET 100 in 2011.

References

External links
 

Mobile web browsers
Android web browsers
iOS web browsers
Software based on WebKit
2011 software